Bellengreville is a commune in the Seine-Maritime department in the Normandy region in north-western France.

Geography

Population

Places of interest
 The church of St. Germain, dating from the eighteenth century.
 Remains of a thirteenth-century church at Inerville.
 A ruined sixteenth-century manorhouse.

See also
Communes of the Seine-Maritime department

References

Communes of Seine-Maritime